The Loyola Ramblers men's volleyball team (also Loyola Chicago Ramblers) represents Loyola University Chicago in NCAA competition as a member of the Midwestern Intercollegiate Volleyball Association (MIVA), one of the seven conferences that compete at the National Collegiate level of NCAA men's volleyball. The Ramblers are coached by John Hawks, who replaced Mark Hulse after the 2022 season. Hulse had spent the previous seven seasons at Loyola, having been let go after seven seasons and an overall record of 120–61. Before Hulse, the Ramblers were coached by Loyola alumnus Shane Davis. His record through 12 seasons was 265–88 (.751), and he led the Ramblers to back-to-back NCAA championships.

In 2013, the Ramblers (22–10) were defeated by the UCI Anteaters 0–3 (24–26, 18–25, 27–29) in the first semifinal of the NCAA championships on May 2, 2013, at UCLA's Pauley Pavilion. This was the team's first appearance ever in an NCAA men's collegiate volleyball tournament.

On May 3, 2014, Loyola (29–1), playing host to the 2014 Championships, defeated the Stanford Cardinal (24–9) 3–1 to win the program's first-ever NCAA Men's National Collegiate Volleyball Championship.

On May 10, 2015, Loyola (28–2) defeated the Lewis Flyers (26–4) in a thrilling 3–2 win for back-to-back NCAA Men's National Collegiate Volleyball Championship.

All-Americans
The Loyola men's volleyball program has seen 31 AVCA All American honors (including Honorable Mentions).

National awards

Footnotes

References

External links